is a Japanese manga series written and illustrated by Julietta Suzuki. It was serialized in Hakusensha's shōjo manga magazine Hana to Yume from February 2008 to May 2016, with the chapters collected in 25 tankōbon volumes. The series is licensed for regional release in North America by Viz Media as part of their Shojo Beat imprint. An anime adaptation has been produced by TMS Entertainment and directed by Akitaro Daichi and began airing in October 2012. It has been streamed by Funimation Entertainment in North America. A second season was announced and premiered during January 2015.

Plot

Nanami Momozono dreams of living an average school life just like any other high school girl does. Instead, she must cope with the fact that her father, who is a constant gambler, has accumulated a bunch of gambling debts in her name. As she can't afford to pay the rent, she gets kicked out of her apartment by the debt collectors and is now homeless. Despite this unfortunate turn of events, she still maintains a kind heart.

While sitting on a park bench collecting her thoughts, Nanami meets a strange man hanging from a tree because he is being chased by a dog. After saving him from the dog, she learns that the man's name is Mikage. Upon learning about Nanami's current situation, in a perfect example of how good deeds are rewarded, he gives her his home as a token of his gratitude. She accepts the offer because she is homeless. When Nanami arrives at Mikage's home, she is shocked to see that it is not a normal home but a shrine for worship. After being greeted by Onikiri and Kotetsu, who are the keepers of the shrine, she meets Tomoe, Mikage's familiar, and she learns that Mikage used to be the Land God of the shrine and has bestowed upon her his mark on her forehead so that she may be the new God. At first, Nanami is reluctant, but as she lives with Tomoe, Onikiri, and Kotetsu she begins to understand and works hard in her new position as the Land God. As the story progresses Nanami finds herself falling in love with Tomoe, but he rejects her because the love between a human and a yokai is taboo. Despite saying that, Tomoe finds himself falling in love with her too.

Characters

Main characters

A teenage high school girl whose father ran out on her because of his gambling debts, and she was often mocked for her poverty by her classmates. She becomes the local land god after Mikage transfers his position over to her. Nanami begins with very little spiritual power, but she works hard at balancing her godly duties with her schoolwork and eventually becomes relatively adept at her duties; becoming an expert at using her only godly weapon, white talismans, with which she can do many things as long as they do not exceed her in strength. She also uses a Shikigami called Mamoru voiced by Daiki Yamashita (child) and Hinata Kusunoki (monkey) (Japanese) Aaron Roberts (child), Bryn Apprill (monkey) (English) . His base form is that of a small monkey that can fit in the palm of her hand, but he can take the shape of a young boy. With him, she is able to create barriers against evil that can do various things, ranging from purification to the banishing of evil yokai.

She's prone to taking action without thinking about what to do, merely focusing on her beliefs which results in her improvising and greatly relying on Tomoe to get her through any obstacles, though she tends to try and avoid the latter for anything beyond simple tasks. Her simple mindset proves unique among the gods and yokai and offers them a different perspective, which helps many of them with their problems and even helps change them for the better.

At the end of the manga that, after a 10 year time skip, she is married to Tomoe, who is now a human. Mamoru is still with her, but he is a normal monkey since she is no longer a god. She is shown to have worked as a kindergarten teacher during the interim, but is retiring due to the advancement of her pregnancy. She gives birth to a baby boy. She and Tomoe are then shown to revisit Mikage shrine after having fulfilled/completed the journey of becoming an adult.

A fox yokai who serves as the familiar of the land god Mikage. When Nanami becomes the new land god, she makes a contract with Tomoe to turn him into her familiar, much to his displeasure. He is very hostile and condescending to Nanami at the start of the series, but this changes as the series progresses, as he watches her conduct her new godly duties with enthusiasm and perseverance. When going as a human, he takes Mikage as his last name.

He has a very cynical and often mocking demeanor, partly because he is distrustful of others, but he can be very charming when the occasion demands it. He is extremely devoted to Nanami, despite his initial hostility; While he often treats like a child and mocks her, his care is shown through his various acts of kindness for her and refusing to kill anyone in front of her. He is also extremely powerful, and is apparently able to disable other familiars, yokai, even many deities without much effort. However, his power is restricted by Nanami's words, which means that if she orders him to do something with a certain amount of force, he must comply. He can transform himself and others with enchanted leaves, but his real power lies in the use of his Fox-Fire, which can hunt down any foe relentlessly and even manipulate other flames. Tomoe worries a great deal about Nanami and is very aware of how delicate she is as a human, threatening anyone who harms or speaks ill of her. He initially has a very condescending view of humans in general, Nanami being the only exception, and despite his desire to think different as the series progresses, he struggles to affirm the new ideals, until he sees Akura-Oh change and Nanami comforts him by telling them that everyone changes.

He eventually comes to realize his own feelings for her which result in an old death curse which was placed on him being reawakened, but he is saved by Nanami who travels through time to save him and in doing so, help them both discover various truths about his past that neither of them knew such as the fact that the human Tomoe loved in the past was not Yukiji, but rather Nanami accidentally pretending to be her. This reaffirms their feelings to each other and they get engaged after this.

Tomoe makes the decision to become human after he sees a shrine maiden whom he had seen almost 100 years before as a child, in the present as an old, blind woman who can only reminiscent about their brief meeting. He's stunned by the shortness of human life and the slow perception of time for Yokai. Having no desire to part with Nanami after she dies, he decide to become human in order to ensure they are always together. This results in a blunder where he turned into a fox, but he is eventually restored to his Yokai state.

It is later shown at the end of the manga, that a 10-year time period has lapsed, and that he is married to Nanami. He becomes human after their marriage ceremony happens by going to Okuninushi, who in doing so, is carrying out Kuromaro's final request. He is shown working at a company which he enjoys working at, but retires having decided to return to the Shrine since Nanami is having their child. Nanami gives birth to a baby boy. It is later shown that they return to Mikage shrine after Nanami has completed her journey to become a full adult.

A mysterious man who was once the land god of the shrine, and who left twenty years ago for unspecified reasons. He met a newly homeless Nanami and bestowed the land god mark on her, saying that she was better suited to be the god than him. He has light hair and glasses and wears a trench coat and hat. He can appear as a butterfly. Throughout the manga he is portrayed as someone shrouded in mystery on what his true motives really are, but it is hinted that his plan has been to show Tomoe that humans and yokai can fall in love and that Nanami may be the one who can reach Tomoe.

His plan was set in motion when he met Nanami who was travelling through time while trying to save Tomoe from a curse. After she had discovered the way to stop the curse, she attempted to return but accidentally wound up landing 20 years too early. There she met the Mikage of the past and told him of the events of the future, letting him know what to do and what actions to take, thereby setting the events of the story into motion.

A wildly popular idol with the gimmick of being a "fallen angel" with goth makeup and a bad boy attitude. He is actually, a crow tengu from the Kurama mountain, who initially wished to become the land god by eating Nanami's heart. After being thwarted by Tomoe and subsequently saved by Nanami, he gives up on this scheme and regards her as a friend, even allowing her to stay at his apartment when she temporarily loses her godhood. He has a lingering dislike for Tomoe, and the two are prone to insulting each other whenever they meet. He left Mount Kurama seventeen years ago after being treated cruelly by other tengu due to his inability to fly despite being the direct child of the Third Sojobo, and has been living in the human world since then. He is also shown to have a more human-like attitude compared to Tomoe and Mizuki, understanding the minor details required to blend into human society. He also has feelings for Nanami and always tries to flirt with her, but he seems to have accepted her relationship with Tomoe and moved on. He begins to develop feelings for Nanami's friend, Ami, when he's confronted by her intense feelings towards him, but he's not sure if they count as love.
At the end of the series, he decides to move back to Mount Kurama in order to help determine the Fourth Sojobo, which would also entail helping to train them. He resigns as an idol and when Ami confesses her love for him, he tries to dissuade her, but promises to eventually come back and see her, if she's still not moved on.

A lonely snake familiar of the abandoned and submerged Yonomori shrine. When Nanami saves his life from her cruel classmates by releasing him out a window, he falls in love with her. He abducts her soon after, intending to marry her. In spite of this, Nanami takes pity on him and promises to visit after Tomoe rescues her. He hates Tomoe, evident to his constant mocking and bantering. He even goes as far as to manipulate Nanami various times through the act of "helping" to try and deter her feelings towards Tomoe, though she is unaware. He later becomes Nanami's familiar to save her from a sea demon after she inadvertently sacrifices herself to save Tomoe. He has the power to make wonderful sake, but beyond that he has few talents. He also says that he can be himself whenever he is with Nanami. He is extremely devoted to Nanami.

His original god, Yonomori, was a god created by people out of necessity in their time of need. As such, she was unlike most other gods and required constant belief to maintain her existence. When the village near her shrine was submerged for a reservoir, she lost this belief and returned to nature; Her only regret was that Mizuki would be alone.

After Nanami and Tomoe are married, he stays at the Mikage shrine, presumably becoming Mikage's familiar. He is there when Nanami and Tomoe return to the shrine with their son and rushes to meet them.

 and 

The two bald, childlike yokai attendants at Nanami's shrine who wear masks. Just like Tomoe, they are able to shapeshift. They are extremely fond of Nanami, Tomoe, Mizuki and Mikage. It is implied that there is an unpleasant sight underneath their masks.

Yokai
Kirakaburi (煌かぶり, Kirakaburi, lit. "beautiful killer")

Voiced by: Takehito Koyasu (Japanese)

Yokai who serves under Akura-ou. He has a love for killing and decapitating and then placing the heads he had cut off on flowers. He's a sadistic person who has absolutely no mercy and kills, believing it was beautiful to cut a head off and pair it up with a flower. He however respects Akura-Ou and obliges to his wishes. He also hates things that he considers ugly, such as the furball he had to pair up with. He stated that Tomoe was beautiful but cold.  He can be cautious and knows his limits as shown when he did not try to attack the stronger gods in Izumo he was not confident in defeating. However, those he recognizes are below him he insults, this attitude making underestimating furball a fatal mistake.

He had gone to Izumo and cut off the heads of some gods and presenting it to Akura-Ou. However, Tomoe appeared to be disgusted by his taste. Tomoe was displeased to find all the heads belonged to weak female gods, and the god who tried to kill him was not there. He was also tasked to capture Yukiji/Nanami, given the freedom to do what so ever to her long as he does not touch her head. Attacking her, he killed some of his guards but accidentally lets Nanami get away, tricked by her one of her white talismans. He soon catches up to Nanami but then is severely wounded by Tomoe. Unable to move, he is devoured by Furball out of spite.

A catfish princess of the Tatara Swamp who lives in a palace with her many fish attendants. Ten years ago, she fell in love with a young boy named Kotarō Urashima when she saw him crying at the swamp because he was lost. She asks Nanami to help her reconnect with the boy once again. This is done by disguising her a human and helping them meet and fall in love. As repayment, when Nanami visits her palace, she allows her to wear one of her luxurious kimono so she will look her best in front of Tomoe. When Kotarō finds out she is a Yokai, he is initially disillusioned by it, but later realizes he loves her and apologizes much to everyone's delight.
At the end of the series, she is pregnant with Kotarō's child, which only possible because she was partially human in her disguise. While many of her female attendants approve of the child and her relationship with Kotarō, her more traditional attendants take issue with the partially human nature of the child and only allow her to keep it, if she cuts off all contact with humans, even preventing her from saying a proper farewell to Kotarō. Nanami helps them meet up by inviting them to her wedding, and they decide to runaway together so that no one can push them apart.

Dragon Lord of the sea, who has been waiting to seek revenge against Tomoe for 526 years for ripping out his right eye and attacking the north gate of Ryūgū Castle. He found Tomoe after he saved Ami from drowning in the sea. The Dragon Lord's eyes are known as the Longevity Elixir and are said to give great power to whoever drinks them. Though aggressive and temperamental, he is afraid of his wife's anger. He is forced to give up his grudge against Tomoe after his wife befriends Nanami. He is very shocked to learn that Nanami and Tomoe were engaged.

The wife of the Dragon King. She disapproves of her husband's fights with Tomoe, partially because she knows he cannot beat Tomoe and only risks hurting himself more. She meets with Nanami by chance and becomes friends with her, further dampening her husbands attempts at combat with Tomoe.

Akura-Ou, was an infamous yokai. He worked with Tomoe, wreaking havoc to the world. His body was a mutation, as he could recover from any injury no matter how severe. This resulted in a twisted mind-set that prevented him from understanding the fleeting nature of the world and the pain when things are broken beyond repair. Tomoe worked with him, acting as the brains of their plans until he fell in love with the human, Yukiji. Tomoe attempted to distance himself and Yukiji from Akura-Oh, who constantly expressed the desire to break Tomoe's "toys". He was eventually led to Yukiji by Yatori and he killed her. Tomoe responded by "killing" him, which resulted in his body and spirit being separated. After this, he was sent to Yomi-no-Kuni and lived there for a long time until the soul of a young, recently deceased, boy named Kirihito Mori came to him and asked him to send an apology to his parents because they had fought just before his death. Akura-Ou accepted out of boredom and curiosity and hence took up the boy's body, waking in a hospital room and being hugged by "his" mother. After some time, Akura-Ou regained some of his followers despite being in Kirihito's body. Two of which were two cat-masked shikigami. He soon decided he wanted to get his original body back from Yomi-no-Kuni. Kayako fell in love with him sometime after and he used her to try to get into the God's Summit. When she failed, he left her, finding her no longer useful. 
 
He first met Nanami while she was being chased by the fallen gods. They were angry at her for being a human yet dared to accept the invitation to the God's Summit. Akura-Ou then insulted them as being a lower status than her causing one fallen god to hit him, giving him a serious injury. This angered Nanami, who then used Mamoru to repel the gods. She attempted to tend to Akura-Ou's wounds, but he refused her help and attempted to kiss her, making Nanami panic and flee. He then went to Yomotsu Hirasaka and opened the Kyo Gan Mon in an attempt to get his body back. However, Nanami and Otohiko came to guard the gates since the original guard was currently at the God's Summit, disrupting Akura-Ou's plans. Tekkimaru, one of his yokai followers, immediately held Akura-Ou hostage in defense so that Otohiko would not attack them due to Akura-Ou being human, though they did not know of him being Akura-Ou. Tekkimaru then jumped into Yomi-no-Kuni believing it will give him an immortal body, bringing Akura-Ou together with him. Immediately, Tekkimaru rotted due to not being a god. Akura-Ou's human body began to rot as well. In fear for his safety, Nanami jumped in after him. 
 
He woke up before Nanami within the Yomi-no-Kuni. He got a lock of her hair and wrapped it around his wrist to protect him from rotting. Soon they were fetched by the servants of the god of Yomi-no-Kuni named Izanami. Nanami asked Izanami to send them back, she replied that only Nanami could go and that Akura-Ou could not due to his body already being dead. After which, Akura-Ou was snatched up by a giant hand and disappeared one of the cells. He had flashbacks in the darkness and wondered if everything that had happened was only a dream.

He was soon rescued by Nanami but could not understand why she did so. He hugged her fiercely, marveling at her warmth. She pulls away, saying she belongs to Tomoe, to which he is intrigued by. She led him to the entrance but it was blocked by Ikusagami, the war god. However, they were soon rescued by Tomoe and brought back to the world above. There, he attacks him, but then looks at Nanami and decides to do it another time.

When he is suffering as the human body he is using cannot sustain him for long, Nanami gives up a part of her life force to help him, but he takes much more reducing her life span. It is here when Nanami sees Akura-Ou in him and realizes the truth. He leaves her alive barely only because she might be useful later but it is assume he has slight feelings for her. This idea is reinforced when she says that she and Tomoe belong to each other, and he wonders why those words "pierce" him.

Once a pitiful, weak yokai named Furball, Yatori served under Akura-Oh in the olden times. He slowly gained strength by eating those who stood in his, or Akura-Oh's way. He took on a human appearance by possessing one of Yukiji's servants, Sukeroku. He was fiercely loyal to Akura-Oh and when Akura-Oh returned, Yatori sought him out in order to continue serving him.

Jirō is currently the fourth chief of Kurama Mountain. The tengu leading all other tengu due to his unsurpassed strength and speed. When the third chief, fell ill to an unknown, incurable sickness, Jirō stepped up and took his place. On the first few parts, Jirō was known as a cruel leader. He was merciless and banished many other tengu when they showed any sign of weakness. An example was how he had treated Kurama when he had been younger.
 
After he met Nanami under the Thousand Year Old Sakura Tree he seemed to develop a crush on her though he refused to admit it. He got distracted thinking of her, hence letting the wards he placed around his temple weaken. According to his servant, Yatori, this was due to chaos within his own heart. After discovering Yatori's betrayal, when Nanami was being attacked by the Raijiuyu, he sacrificed himself to save her and confessed his love to her in what he thought were his last words.

Unari is the leader of sea yokai in the sea around Okinawa. Her mother was a mermaid, but her father was part of the dragon-clan, which resulted in her having horns and part of face being covered in scales. These features made Unari's mother see her as ugly and so she was given a robe of feathers to cover her face. Akura-Oh attempted to steal this robe, as it is impervious to fire and would have been necessary to retrieve his body, but Nanami managed to take it back from him, in exchange for giving him part of her life span.
While her robe was stolen, she was in a terrible rage and kidnapped Ami, believing her to be an accomplice of the thief. Mizuki and Kurama went to calm her down, which resulted in them seeing her face. While Kurama was shocked, Mizuki did not see her as ugly and even stated that she was very beautiful. They were briefly engaged before Unari realized that Mizuki loved Nanami, and decided to let him leave with her. However, Mizuki promised to come back one a year on the same day, just to spend time with her. She gives him her robe of feathers as a parting gift, showing that she no longer needs it now that she has found someone to love.

Deities

A feminine male wind god. He initially disapproves of Nanami as the land god but acknowledges her after she successfully dispels the miasma that he had released on the shrine.

A bratty, selfish sky god who has an unrequited crush on Tomoe. She steals Nanami's mark, shrinks Tomoe into a toddler, and takes control of the shrine for a short period. She is very demanding and apparently goes through attendants at an unheard-of rate and seems to take sadistic delight in abusing her familiars.

The God of Wealth who owns a large shrine in Izumo. He is in charge of the Divine Assembly held every year for deities.

The War god who is reluctant to acknowledge Nanami, a human to be a Land God.

 and 
 (Koume) 

 (Kotake) 
Two of the 32 Dog-Lions of Narukami and are her most loyal servants. The sides of their hair resemble that of dog ears.

He is in charge of changing the year.

Other characters

The first friend Nanami ever made at school. Originally, she found Nanami to be weird, but she also took a liking to Nanami. After Nanami, or rather Tomoe disguised as her, rescued her from a demon, she began to hang around Nanami more and officially became a friend after she helped her talk to Kurama. She made a promise with Kurama to not tell anyone about any of the strange occurrences that happen with Nanami, though it was Tomoe in disguise. Ami believes Nanami is a miko, or shrine maiden. Overall, Ami is a naive but bubbly and gentle girl, and a very reliable friend. She and Kei later find out that Nanami is a god and all the others are yokai but they accept it quite well. Ami also has a huge crush on Kurama, who has slowly started to return those feelings, but they are not yet in a relationship.

 
Kei is Ami's best friend. After Ami befriends Nanami, she also begins to see Nanami as a friend. Among the trio, she is the most mature, but also the most hot tempered. She is intuitive and picked up on the fact Nanami liked Tomoe. Kei gave advice to Nanami on how she could get his attention. She is rarely ever seen without her cellphone, on which she constantly sends text messages at a rapid pace, of which most of the time she does not even bother to glance at the screen.

A beautiful woman with long brown hair that Tomoe had a relationship with in the past (though in reality it is Nanami, who time travels through Yukiji's body on one occasion, and stands in as Yukiji while time traveling in her own body on another, who Tomoe falls in love with). She barely escaped a yokai attack on her village, of which Tomoe in particular attacked her body when Nanami was in it, causing her a deep hatred for yokai. She is also the ancestor of Nanami, who actually helped her when marrying into another family. She later saw Nanami with Tomoe and eventually used their similarities in appearance to ask Tomoe for help when attacked by Akura-Ou. However, Tomoe does not see the eyes of Yukiji during the time that he spends with her, because Yukiji feared that he would know that she was not Nanami after looking into her eyes. She used his protection in order to save the next generation of her and her husband's bloodline. At one time she became extremely sick, so Tomoe went and carved out the Dragon King's eye to cure her. Since then, the eye resides within the host until they have a child, hence everyone who is Nanami's direct ancestor is a woman. As long as they eye resides within them, they are protected from any sickness and as such all of them are blessed with beauty. However, the moment they have a child, which is always a daughter, the eye passes to the child and they become susceptible to disease.

A young human boy and Himemiko's love interest. Himemiko requested Nanami to help her to find a way to meet him again. Kotarou was shy around Himemiko when he first met her but, after getting to know her, grew fond of her and eventually fell in love with her. After discovering Himemiko was a yokai, Kotarou rejected her for lying to him about her true identity. After clearing his thoughts and some persuasion from the Dragon King, he interrupted Himemiko's marriage to Nishiki, and Himemiko's true form emerges while they are escaping. Kotarou shows an amused expression (and almost lost his breath, as they were underwater) before telling Himemiko that he accepts her no matter what her appearance was.

Nanami's mother. Kumimi had died from an unknown disease and left her only daughter Nanami to be responsible for the house-hold, plus her husband (which is Nanami's father) of keeping him in check.

A classmate of Nanami's from school who enjoys picking on her.

A classmate of Nanami's from school.

A female goddess who is often seen sleeping, as the Fumigae Gods complained that she should have not slept throughout the year if she had known that she would sleep her way through the Izumo gods meeting.

Media

Manga
Written and illustrated by Julietta Suzuki, Kamisama Kiss was serialized in the semi-monthly shōjo manga magazine Hana to Yume from February 20, 2008 to May 20, 2016. The 149 individual chapters were later collected and published in 25 tankōbon volumes by Hakusensha, released between September 19, 2008 and August 19, 2016. North American publisher Viz Media licensed the English language distributions rights at the 2009 New York Anime Festival.

Volume list

Anime

An anime television series adaptation of Kamisama Kiss was produced by TMS Entertainment and directed by Akitaro Daichi. It ran from October 1, 2012, to December 24, 2012, on TV Tokyo. The anime has been licensed for streaming by Funimation Entertainment. The series ended at around the 30th chapter of the manga volume. There are two OVA episodes, which first aired on August 26, 2013, bundled with the 16th volume of the manga. One of the included episodes is based on the story from the 15th volume, while the other contains an all-new original story. The 17th issue of Hakusensha's Hana to Yume magazine announced in August 2014 that the manga series inspired a second anime season, which began airing on January 5, 2015. A four-part original animation DVD (OAD) known as  began airing on August 20, 2015, and is based on the "past arc" of the series, spanning from the 14th through 17th volumes of the manga series. The story follows Nanami as she goes back in time to find a cure for Tomoe's curse which he had placed on himself so he could become human and live out his life with Yukiji. A new OAD, previously announced as Kamisama, Kekkon Zenya, released as Kamisama, Shiawase ni Naru was bundled with the Kamisama Hajimemashita 25.5 official fanbook on December 20, 2016.

Musical
A stage musical adaptation titled Kamisama Hajimemashita: The Musical ran from March 21 to March 29, 2015 in Japan. Additional cast members include  as Onikiri, Keita Tokushiro and  double-cast as Kotetsu, and Juria Kawakami as Narukami. Akira Ishida made a cameo reprising his role as Mikage in voice. The musical had a re-run in 2016, with  re-cast as Mizuki, LinQ member  re-cast as Kotetsu, and Makoto Okunaka re-cast as Narukami.

Reception
Jacob Chapman of Anime News Network, describes Kamisama Kiss as a 50/50 cross between Inuyasha and Fruits Basket. The manga had 5 million copies in print as of March 2016.

References

External links
 Kamisama Kiss at Viz Media
 
 Official Web Site at TV Tokyo (Japanese)

2008 manga
2012 anime television series debuts
Anime series based on manga
Funimation
Hakusensha franchises
Hakusensha manga
Madman Entertainment anime
Romantic comedy anime and manga
Shinto in fiction
Shinto kami in anime and manga
Shōjo manga
Supernatural anime and manga
TMS Entertainment
TV Tokyo original programming
Viz Media manga
Yōkai in anime and manga